The 6th Singapore Division (6 DIV) is a combined arms division of the Singapore Army.

History 
The 6th Division was formed on 1 October 1976 as a reserve division to manage and train reservist units. In November 1976, HQ 6th Singapore Infantry Brigade, was formed under the 6th Division's command.

In November 1992, the 6th Division became a combined arms division as part of the reorganisation within the Singapore Armed Forces (SAF), having at least one Infantry brigade and one Armour brigade, among others. In the 2000s, the HQ 6th Division relocated to Mandai Hill Camp. In November 2020, HQ Army Intelligence and HQ Artillery came under the command of the 6th Division.

References 

 

Singapore Army
Formations of the Singapore Army
Military units and formations established in 1976